The Hydro Hotel is a heritage-listed hotel located at Chelmsford Place, Leeton in the Leeton Shire local government area of New South Wales, Australia. It was added to the New South Wales State Heritage Register on 2 April 1999.

History

Heritage listing 
Hydro Hotel was listed on the New South Wales State Heritage Register on 2 April 1999.

See also

References

Bibliography

Attribution

External links 

New South Wales State Heritage Register
Leeton, New South Wales
Hotels in New South Wales
Articles incorporating text from the New South Wales State Heritage Register